The robust dtella (Gehyra robusta) is a species of gecko endemic to Queensland in  Australia.

References

Gehyra
Reptiles described in 1984
Geckos of Australia